Richard Denniss is the Executive Director of The Australia Institute. He is a prominent Australian economist, author and public policy commentator, and a former Associate Professor in the Crawford School of Public Policy at the Australian National University in Canberra, Australia. Denniss was described by Mark Kenny in the Sydney Morning Herald as "a constant thorn in the side of politicians on both sides due to his habit of skewering dodgy economic justifications for policy". In October 2018, The Australian Financial Review listed Denniss and Ben Oquist of The Australia Institute as equal tenth-place on their 'Covert Power' list of the most powerful people in Australia.

Career 
Prior to his appointment at The Australia Institute, Denniss was Senior Strategic Advisor to Australian Greens Leader Senator Bob Brown and was also Chief of Staff to Senator Natasha Stott Despoja, former Leader of the Australian Democrats. Denniss also worked as a researcher at the H.V. Evatt Memorial Foundation (the 'Evatt Foundation'), a public policy organisation with strong links to the Australian Labor Party. His academic work has resulted in publications in various peer-reviewed journals, and he has lectured in Economics at the University of Newcastle.

During the 2000s Denniss' research focused on climate change policy and tax policy. He also worked on a number of projects aimed at improving the measurement of government and economic performance including the 'Genuine Progress Indicator' (GPI), the 'Wellbeing Manifesto', and the state of Australian Government.

666 ABC Canberra produced and broadcast "An occasional series with 'The Moral Economist'" podcast starring Richard Denniss, in 2013. The series discussed economic issues from the dollar cost of a human life to preventative health care to who deserves welfare.

In 2015 Denniss delivered the 16th Manning Clark Lecture at The Australian National University. The speech drew from Clark's writings, identifying 'enlargers' and 'punishers' in Australian cultural, economic and political history.

Australian Labor Party MP Andrew Leigh is quoted as saying, "I think of Richard as being kind of a mirror image of [free-market economist and former Reserve Bank board member] Warwick McKibbin."

Publications
Denniss is the co-author (with Clive Hamilton) of best-selling book Affluenza: When Too Much is Never Enough  and An introduction to Australian Public Policy (with Sarah Maddison).  He co-authored Minority policy: rethinking governance when parliament matters with Brenton Prosser, a book that examines the operations of minority government and implications for public policy in Westminster systems. In 2016, his book Econobabble was published by Black Inc and Redback. Most recently, Denniss has published Curing Affluenza, a followup to Affluenza: When too Much is Never Enough, and is the author of the June 2018 Quarterly Essay, Dead Right: How Neoliberalism Ate Itself and What Comes Next.

Denniss is a regular contributor to The Monthly and Quarterly Essay, as well as producing columns in The Canberra Times and The Australian Financial Review.

External links
 The Australia Institute research by Richard Denniss
 Article archive at The Monthly
 Article archive at The Australian Financial Review
 Article archive at The Canberra Times
 Recorded appearances

References

Living people
Sustainability advocates
Australian economists
Academic staff of the Australian National University
Year of birth missing (living people)